Dirk Matschenz (born 30 May 1979, in Erfurt) is a Dutch male skeleton racer, who took part in the 2005/2006 Skeleton World Cup trying to qualify for the 2006 Winter Olympics. He previously competed for Germany, winning the German Championship in 2001.

World Cup 2005/2006 Results 
 DNF on 10 November 2005, Calgary CAN
 20th on 17 November 2005, Lake Placid, New York, U.S.

References

External links

 

1979 births
Living people
Dutch male skeleton racers
German male skeleton racers
Sportspeople from Erfurt